The HTC ADR6325, originally known as the HTC Lexikon and now known as the HTC Merge, is a device created by HTC. It is identified as a flagship phone carried by US Cellular and Alltel Wireless and came to Verizon Wireless and "C Spire Wireless" in the summer of 2011. It features an 800 MHz processor, 3.8" capacitive touchscreen, 5 Mega Pixel camera with LED flash quality and a 720p camcorder as well as a full QWERTY keyboard and Android 2.2 "Froyo" with the HTC Sense 1.5 User Interface, it also features 2 GB onboard storage.

The HTC Merge is a Multi-band device supporting both GSM and CDMA2000 cellular communications.

Merge